James Loyd Hilton (born January 23, 1959) is an American psychologist, educator, and academic administrator.

Hilton had been served as University Librarian and Dean of Libraries of the University of Michigan since September 1, 2013. He is also Vice Provost for Academic Innovation, responsible for developing strategies and policies around educational technology and other cross-campus digital education initiatives.

Education

Hilton received a bachelor of arts with a major in psychology from the University of Texas at Austin in 1981. He received a master of arts and a doctor of philosophy in social psychology from Princeton University in 1983 and 1985, respectively.

Career

Hilton served as Vice President and Chief Information Officer at the University of Virginia from 2006 until 2013. From 2001 to 2006 he was the Associate Provost for Academic Information and Instructional Technology Affairs at the University of Michigan, and served as the Interim University Librarian for one year in 2005. Hilton was a member of the faculty at the University of Michigan in the Psychology Department where he served as the Chair of Undergraduate Studies between 1991 and 2000.

Hilton is a three-time recipient of the University of Michigan's Literature, Science, and the Arts Excellence in Education award, an Arthur F. Thurnau Professor, and recipient of the Class of 1923 Memorial Teaching Award. He published in the areas of information technology policy, person perception, stereotypes, and the psychology of suspicion.

Awards, fellowships, and honors

Awards include: 
 CIC Academic Leadership Program Fellow, 1997–98
 Sweetland Writing Center Fellow, University of Michigan, 1997–98
 L.S.A. Excellence in Education Award, University of Michigan, 1995
 L.S.A. Excellence in Education Award, University of Michigan, 1994
 L.S.A. Excellence in Education Award, University of Michigan, 1992
 Class of 1923 Memorial Teaching Award, University of Michigan, 1991 
 Master Lecturer Award from the Michigan Psychological Association, 1989

Board memberships

 DuraSpace 
 Internet2 Board of Trustees 
 Digital Preservation Network

Personal life

He has been married to Molly Pitts Hilton since 1982 and has two children.

Notes and references

External links 

 University of Michigan profile

1959 births
Living people
American librarians
University of Michigan faculty
Academic librarians